Allan Rodrigues de Souza (born 3 March 1997), simply known as Allan, is a Brazilian professional footballer who plays as a midfielder for Atlético Mineiro.

Club career

Internacional
Born in Araçatuba, São Paulo, Allan rose through the ranks as a youth product of Internacional. Goal Brazil’s deputy editor Rodrigo Calvozzo claimed Allan "was always treated by Internacional as one of the most important players in the team."

Liverpool
In the summer of 2015, he joined English Premier League club Liverpool for a fee of £500,000 after impressing the club's coaches at the Frenz International Cup.

On 2 September 2015, he was loaned to Finnish club Seinäjoen Jalkapallokerho on a short term deal. Allan scored on his debut eight days later, coming on in the 56th minute for Jussi Vasara and opening the scoring sixteen minutes later in a 1–1 draw away to KuPS. He finished the season with one goal in eight appearances, in the process helping the club win the Veikkausliiga title. On 29 October 2015, Allan returned from his loan spell to Liverpool, greeting the new manager of the club, Jürgen Klopp, for the first time.

On 18 January 2016, Liverpool announced that Allan had been loaned to Belgian club Sint-Truiden for the remainder of the season. He then returned to Liverpool in expectation of receiving a British work permit, which was not granted.

Allan signed for Hertha BSC on 5 August 2016 on a season-long loan deal, after Klopp recommended him to Hertha head coach Pal Dardai.

On 31 August 2017, Allan joined Cypriot side Apollon Limassol on a season-long loan.

In July 2018 he signed a new deal with Liverpool and joined Eintracht Frankfurt on a season-long loan.

On 15 February 2019, Allan joined Brazilian side Fluminense on loan until the end of the season after his loan spell in Germany was cut short.

Atlético Mineiro
On 8 January 2020, Allan joined Atlético Mineiro on a four-year contract.

Style of play
A central midfielder by trade, Allan is primarily left-footed and employs a strong passing range, honed with time spent as a deep-lying playmaker in Brazil. Allan has proven himself a useful box-to-box midfielder with promising attacking instincts.

Career statistics

Honours
SJK
Veikkausliiga: 2015

Atlético Mineiro
Campeonato Brasileiro Série A: 2021
Copa do Brasil: 2021
Campeonato Mineiro: 2020, 2021, 2022
Supercopa do Brasil: 2022

Individual
Campeonato Mineiro Team of the Tournament: 2020, 2022

References

External links

Profile at the Atlético Mineiro website

1997 births
Living people
Footballers from Porto Alegre
Brazilian footballers
Association football midfielders
Liverpool F.C. players
Seinäjoen Jalkapallokerho players
Sint-Truidense V.V. players
Hertha BSC players
Apollon Limassol FC players
Eintracht Frankfurt players
Fluminense FC players
Clube Atlético Mineiro players
Veikkausliiga players
Belgian Pro League players
Bundesliga players
Cypriot First Division players
Campeonato Brasileiro Série A players
Brazilian expatriate footballers
Brazilian expatriate sportspeople in England
Brazilian expatriate sportspeople in Finland
Brazilian expatriate sportspeople in Belgium
Brazilian expatriate sportspeople in Germany
Brazilian expatriate sportspeople in Cyprus
Expatriate footballers in England
Expatriate footballers in Finland
Expatriate footballers in Germany
Expatriate footballers in Cyprus
Brazil youth international footballers
Brazil under-20 international footballers